Probrazieria lutaria is a species of air-breathing land snails, terrestrial pulmonate gastropod mollusks in the family Trochomorphidae.

This species is endemic to the Caroline Islands,  Micronesia. It was listed as Vulnerable in 1994 until changing to Data Deficient in 1996.

References

External links
  Baker, H. B. (1941). Zonitid snails from Pacific islands. Part 3 and 4. Bernice P. Bishop Museum Bulletin. 166: 203–370
 Mollusc Specialist Group 1996.  Brazieria lutaria.   2006 IUCN Red List of Threatened Species.   Downloaded on 6 August 2007.

Fauna of Micronesia
Probrazieria
Gastropods described in 1941